New York Central and Hudson River Railroad No. 999 is a 4-4-0 “American” type steam locomotive built for the New York Central and Hudson River Railroad in 1893, which was intended to haul the road's Empire State Express train service.

Development
New York Central's Chief Superintendent of Motive Power & Rolling Stock, William Buchanan, had designed a class of 4-4-0 locomotives known as the Class "I", which were already capable of reaching high speeds, so it was simply a matter of making some modifications to an existing design. In 1893, locomotive #999 was rolled out of the New York Central's West Albany Shops. 

The 999 was mounted on other engines of the class, and had its brakes mounted to the front truck, which was a new approach.

World's fair and later service
 
After the 1893 Chicago World's Fair, the engine continued to pull the Empire State Express between Buffalo and Syracuse until 1899.  When the engine was sent to other parts of the railroad system, it was found to be hard to handle when pulling more than five cars, as it slipped. It was rebuilt with the same 70 inch drivers as the other engines of the class.  In the 1920s, it was given a new boiler and tender, operating local and branch line trains until 1924, when it was restored for exhibition at the Baltimore and Ohio Railroad's "Fair of the Iron Horse" the following year.

Retirement

Advances in locomotive design, particularly the advent of diesel-electric power, eventually rendered No. 999 obsolete.

After touring the nation and making appearances at numerous expositions, including the 1948-49 Chicago Railroad Fair, the unit was retired from service in May 1952, following its demotion to yard switching service in western New York, shuttling express service refrigerator railroad cars.  At this time, the railroad appeared to turn its back on steam power, and consequently, the vast majority of its steam locomotives, including all of its famed Hudsons and Niagaras and all but two Mohawks, were scrapped by 1957. However, the railroad decided to preserve the 999.  The New York Central donated the locomotive to the Chicago Museum of Science and Industry in 1962, though it did not arrive at the museum until 1968.

Once the unit had arrived at the Museum of Science and Industry, the engine was displayed outside, where it began to decay after being exposed to the elements.  In 1993, the museum conducted a major restoration of the 999.  This project included a cosmetic restoration of number 999, and it was placed inside the museum's main hall. The locomotive is displayed with its later 70" drivers, rather than its original 86" wheels.

References

Sources

External links

No. 999 at the Museum of Science and Industry

4-4-0 locomotives
New York Central Railroad locomotives
Passenger locomotives
Steam locomotives of the United States
Individual locomotives of the United States
Standard gauge locomotives of the United States
Railway locomotives introduced in 1893
Preserved steam locomotives of Illinois